Hemizonia is a genus of plants in the family Asteraceae. They are known generally as tarweeds, although some tarweeds belong to other genera, such as Madia and Deinandra. Furthermore, Hemizonia is currently being revised; some species may be segregated into new genera.

Range
The Hemizonia tarweeds are native to southwestern North America, especially California.

Description
Hemizonia are usually sticky, aromatic, yellow-flowered annual plants which are hardy and competitive, especially in the dry Mediterranean climate of California.

Selected species
 Hemizonia arida — Red Rock tarweed
 Hemizonia clementina — Catalina tarweed; Santa Catalina Island, Channel Islands
 Hemizonia congesta — hayfield tarweed; Central Valley (California), California Coast Ranges, SW Oregon
 Hemizonia conjugens—Deinandra conjugens — Otay tarweed; Otay Mesa area, San Diego.
  Hemizonia fasciculata—Deinandra fasciculata — clustered tarweed; Santa Monica Mountains.
 Hemizonia fitchii — Fitch's tarweed
 Hemizonia floribunda — Tecate tarweed
 Hemizonia frutescens
 Hemizonia greeneana
 Hemizonia increscens—Deinandra increscens — grassland tarweed; coastal California and & Channel Islands
 Hemizonia kelloggii — Kellogg's tarweed
 Hemizonia lobbii — threeray tarweed
 Hemizonia minthornii—Deinandra minthornii — Santa Susana tarweed; Simi Hills, Santa Susana Mountains, and Santa Monica Mountains chaparral. State and CNPS listed vulnerable species.
 Hemizonia mohavensis—Deinandra mohavensis — Mojave tarweed; west Mojave Desert, Transverse Ranges, northern Peninsular Ranges
 Hemizonia palmeri
 Hemizonia paniculata — San Diego tarweed
 Hemizonia pungens — common tarweed 
 Hemizonia streetsii

References

External links
USDA Plants Profile: Hemizonia (Tarweeds)
Jepson Manual Treatment: Hemizonia
Encyclopedia of Life: Information on the Tarweeds (Hemizonia species)

Madieae
Flora of California
Flora of Baja California
Flora of Northwestern Mexico
Flora of the Northwestern United States
Flora of the Southwestern United States
Taxa named by Augustin Pyramus de Candolle
Asteraceae genera